No Date, No Signature is a 2017 Iranian drama film directed by Vahid Jalilvand. It was selected as the Iranian entry for the Best Foreign Language Film at the 91st Academy Awards, but it was not nominated.

Premise
While driving his car, Dr. Kaveh Nariman accidentally hits a motorcycle that a family was riding on. The family leaves apparently unscathed. The next day, at his place of work, which is forensic medicine, Dr. Nariman comes across the dead body of the son of the same family, but he refuses to face the family of the deceased in order to find out the main reason of the boy's death.

Cast
 Amir Aghaei as Dr Nariman
 Hedieh Tehrani as Sayeh
 Navid Mohammadzadeh as Moosa
 Zakia Behbahani as Laila
 Saeed Dakh as inspector 
 Alireza Ostadi as knowledge employee 
 Hojjat Hassanpour Sargaroui as Kamal
 Ehsan Rahim Del as the chicken owner
 Alireza Rahim Del as Habib
 Fatemeh Mortazi as Kaveh's mother

Reception

Critical response
On review aggregator website Rotten Tomatoes, 91% of 22 reviews are positive for the film, with an average rating of 7.30/10. Metacritic assigned the film a weighted average score of 71 out of 100, based on 8 reviews, indicating "generally favorable reviews".

Accolades

No Date, No Signature won the Grand Prix in the International Competition in the 2018 Brussels International Film Festival (BRIFF).

See also
 List of submissions to the 91st Academy Awards for Best Foreign Language Film
 List of Iranian submissions for the Academy Award for Best Foreign Language Film

References

External links
 
 
 

2017 films
2017 drama films
Iranian drama films
2010s Persian-language films
Films whose director won the Best Directing Crystal Simorgh